Sturisomatichthys citurensis is a species of armored catfish of the family Loricariidae endemic to Panama where it occurs in the Tuira and Bayano River basins. This species grows to a length of  SL.

References

Harttiini
Fish of Central America
Fish of Panama
Taxa named by Seth Eugene Meek
Taxa named by Samuel Frederick Hildebrand
Fish described in 1913